The Yale Bulldogs represented Yale University in ECAC women's ice hockey during the 2019–20 NCAA Division I women's ice hockey season. In the aftermath of said season, the Bulldogs set a program record for most wins in one season.

Regular season

Standings

Schedule
Source: 

|-
!colspan=12 style="  "| Regular Season
|-

Roster

2019-20 Bulldogs

References

Yale
Yale Bulldogs women's ice hockey seasons
Yale
Yale